Rong Jiang may refer to:

Rong River, a river in Guangxi, China
Jiang Rong (sport shooter) (born 1961), Chinese sport shooter whose surname is Jiang
Jiang Rong (born 1946), pen name of Chinese writer Lü Jiamin